Roth's theorem on arithmetic progressions is a result in additive combinatorics concerning the existence of arithmetic progressions in subsets of the natural numbers. It was first proven by Klaus Roth in 1953. Roth's Theorem is a special case of Szemerédi's Theorem for the case .

Statement
A subset A of the natural numbers is said to have positive upper density if

.

Roth's theorem on arithmetic progressions (infinite version): A subset of the natural numbers with positive upper density contains a 3-term arithmetic progression.

Roth's theorem on arithmetic progressions (finitary version): . 

History
The first result in this direction was Van der Waerden's theorem in 1927, which states that for sufficiently large N, coloring the integers  with  colors will result in a  term arithmetic progression.

Later on in 1936 Erdős and Turán conjectured a much stronger result that any subset of the integers with positive density contains arbitrarily long arithmetic progressions.

In 1953, Roth partially resolved the initial conjecture by proving they must contain an arithmetic progression of length 3 using Fourier analytic methods. Eventually, in 1975, Szemerédi proved Szemerédi's theorem using combinatorial techniques, resolving the original conjecture in full.

Proof techniques
The original proof given by Roth used Fourier analytic methods. Later on another proof was given using Szemerédi's regularity lemma.

Proof sketch via Fourier analysis

Below is a sketch of this proof.

Define the Fourier transform of a function  to be the function  satisfying
,
where .

The proof proceeds in 3 steps.
 Show that a  admits a large Fourier coefficient.
 Deduce that there exists a sub-progression of  such that  has a density increment when restricted to this subprogression.

Step 1

For functions,  define 

Counting Lemma Let  satisfy . Define . Then .

.

Step 2

Lemma 1: Let . Assume that  for a universal constant . Then it is possible to partition  into arithmetic progressions  with length  such that  for all . 

Next, we apply Lemma 1 to obtain a partition into subprogressions. We then use the fact that  produced a large coefficient in step 1 to show that one of these subprogressions must have a density increment:

Step 3
We now iterate step 2. Let  be the density of  after the th iteration. We have that  and  First, see that  doubles (i.e. reach  such that ) after at most  steps. We double  again (i.e reach ) after at most  steps. Since , this process must terminate after at most  steps.

Let  be the size of our current progression after  iterations. By Lemma 2, we can always continue the process whenever  and thus when the process terminates we have that  Also, note that when we pass to a subprogression, the size of our set decreases by a cube root. Therefore

Therefore  so  as desired. 

Unfortunately, this technique does not generalize directly to larger arithmetic progressions to prove Szemerédi's theorem. An extension of this proof eluded mathematicians for decades until 1998, when Timothy Gowers developed the field of higher-order Fourier Analysis specifically to generalize the above proof to prove Szemerédi's theorem.

Proof sketch via graph regularity
Below is an outline of a proof using the Szemerédi regularity lemma.

.

Then the Szemerédi regularity lemma says that for every , there exists a constant  such that every graph has an -regular partition into at most  parts.

We can also prove that triangles between -regular sets of vertices must come along with many other triangles. This is known as the triangle counting lemma.

Let  denote the edge densities  respectively.

.

Using the triangle counting lemma and the Szemerédi regularity lemma, we can prove the triangle removal lemma, a special case of the graph removal lemma.

Triangle Removal Lemma: For all , there exists  such that any graph on  vertices with less than or equal to  triangles can be made triangle-free by removing at most  edges.

This has an interesting corollary pertaining to graphs  on  vertices where every edge of  lies in a unique triangle. In specific, all of these graphs must have  edges.

Take a set  with no 3-term arithmetic progressions. Connect a vertex  to a vertex  if . Similarly, connect  with  if . Finally, connect  with  if .

These numbers form an arithmetic progression in the listed order. The assumption on  then tells us this progression must be trivial: the elements listed above are all equal. Consequently, every edge of  lies in exactly one triangle. The desired conclusion follows.

Extensions and Generalizations
Szemerédi's theorem resolved the original conjecture and generalized Roth's theorem to arithmetic progressions of arbitrary length. Since then it has been extended in multiple fashions to create new and interesting results.

Furstenberg and Katznelson used ergodic theory to prove a multidimensional version and Leibman and Bergelson extended it to polynomial progressions as well. Most recently Green and Tao proved the Green-Tao Theorem which says that the prime numbers contain arbitrarily long arithmetic progressions. Since the prime numbers are a subset of density 0, they introduced a "relative" Szemerédi theorem which applies to subsets with density 0 that satisfy certain pseudorandomness conditions. Later on Conlon, Fox, and Zhao strengthened this theorem by weakening the necessary pseudorandomness condition. In 2020, Bloom and Sisask  proved that any set  such that  diverges must contain arithmetic progressions of length 3; this is the first non-trivial case of another conjecture of Erdős postulating that any such set must in fact contain arbitrarily long arithmetic progressions.

Improving Bounds

There has also been work done on improving the bound in Roth's theorem. The bound from the original proof of Roth's theorem showed that

for some constant . Over the years this bound has been continually lowered by Szemerédi, Heath-Brown, Bourgain, and Sanders. The current (July 2020) best bound is due to Bloom and Sisask who have showed the existence of an absolute constant c>0 such that

In February 2023 a preprint by Kelley and Meka gave a new bound of 

.

There has also been work done on the other end, constructing the largest set with no three-term arithmetic progressions. The best construction has not been improved since 1946 when Behrend improved on the initial construction by Salem and Spencer and proved

.

Due to no improvements in over 70 years, it is conjectured that Behrand's set is the largest possible set with no three-term progressions.

Roth's Theorem in Finite Fields
As a variation, we can consider the analogous problem over finite fields. This problem is actually equivalent to the cap set problem, which asks for the largest subset of  such that no 3 points lie on a line. The cap set problem can be seen as a generalization of the card game Set.

In 2016, Ernie Croot, Vsevolod Lev, Péter Pál Pach, Jordan Ellenberg and Dion Gijswijt developed a new technique based on the polynomial method to prove that .

Roth's Theorem with popular differences

Another generalization of Roth's Theorem shows that for positive density subsets, there not only exists a 3-term arithmetic progression, but that there exist many 3-APs all with the same common difference.

The popular differences theorem thus states that for each  with positive density, there is some  such that the number of 3-APs with common difference  is close to what we would expect.

This theorem was first proven by Green in 2005, who gave a bound of  where  is the tower function. In 2019, Fox and Pham recently improved the bound to 

However, the claim has been shown to be false for 5-APs.

References

External links
 Edmonds, Chelsea; Koutsoukou-Argyraki, Angeliki; Paulson, Lawrence C. Roth's Theorem on Arithmetic Progressions (Formal proof development in Isabelle/HOL, Archive of Formal Proofs)

Theorems in number theory